Jean Chassang (born 8 February 1951) is a former French racing cyclist. His sporting career began with VC Sant Pourcain. He rode in six editions of the Tour de France between 1976 and 1982.

References

External links
 

1951 births
Living people
French male cyclists
Sportspeople from Allier
Cyclists from Auvergne-Rhône-Alpes